Anja Zdovc (born 24 August 1987) is a Slovenian female volleyball player, playing as an outside-spiker. She is part of the Slovenia women's national volleyball team.

She competed at the 2015 Women's European Volleyball Championship. On club level she plays for Vennelles VB.

References

External links
http://www.scoresway.com/?sport=volleyball&page=player&id=6469
http://www.maritima.info/sports/volley-ball/actualites/istres/425/volley-ball-feminin-iopv-anja-zdovc-une-slovene-prometteuse.html 
 

1987 births
Living people
Slovenian women's volleyball players